P93 may refer to:

 , a patrol boat of the Royal Australian Navy
 Papyrus 93, a biblical manuscript
 Ruger P93, a pistol
 P93, a state regional road in Latvia